Sandry's Book, by Tamora Pierce is a fantasy novel set mainly in Emelan. It is the first in a quartet of books: The Circle of Magic, starring four young mages as they discover their magic.

Plot

Four young misfits from four different classes are brought together at the Winding Circle Temple in Emelan. They find themselves housed together as they did not "fit in" when they slept in the dormitories with everyone. They are sent to Discipline Cottage to learn and use their new-found magical abilities. All four have ambient magic, as opposed to academic magic, and the power they use comes from ordinary things all around them. Sandry has magic with threads, Tris with weather, Daja with smithing, and Briar with plants.

Lady Sandrilene fa Toren is locked away in a dark room with a fading oil lamp. She was magically hidden in this storeroom days ago by her nurse, who was murdered moments later just outside the door by a mob bent on destroying everything infected by the fierce plague 
that killed Sandry's parents. Sandry is concerned about the flickering oil lamp, even though she knows there is no chance of anybody finding her as the room she is locked in is protected by magic so that it cannot be found either magically or non-magically, and the only person who knows her whereabouts is her nurse, who is dead. Sandry is afraid of going crazy in the darkness. Unknowingly doing her first piece of magic, Sandry traps the remaining light in a simple braid. A powerful seer, Niklaren Goldeye, finds her and takes her to Winding Circle in Emelan.

Trader Daja Kisubo is the lone survivor when her family's ship is destroyed in a storm. She floats on the water for days, surviving only because she finds a suraku—a survival box full of food and water from the ship. When Niko finds her, they go to the Trader Council so they can decide Daja's fate. Because Daja is the only survivor of her family, they declare her trangshi, or outcast—the worst sort of bad luck. As trangshi, she is forbidden to speak, touch, or write to other Traders. Niko is outraged at the council's decision and conducts her to Winding Circle.

Roach (later named Briar Moss) is a "street rat" in Hajra, Sotat. His mother died when he was four; he was then taken in by the Thief Lord, the leader of the gang Lightning. Each time Roach is caught committing a crime, an "X" is tattooed onto the web of skin between his thumb and forefinger. After his third capture, Roach is sentenced to the docks but is saved by Niko, who stopped the judge and convinced her to allow him to take Roach to Winding Circle. Roach also has the opportunity to choose a new name for himself; he chooses Briar Moss because of his curiosity and experience with plants.

Trisana Chandler is from a merchant's family. She has been passed from relative to relative because of the strange things that occur when she is around. Never staying long in one house, she never had a real family. Eventually, she is brought to Stone Circle Temple by her parents and left there, where she wreaks more havoc still. The temple's dedicate superior pleads with Niko to take her to Winding Circle, and he agrees after Tris starts a hail storm out of anger.

The four children are brought to Winding Circle Temple in Emelan, where they do not fit in. Daja is secluded and ignored because she is a Trader, Tris wreaks havoc through weather when girls upset her by making fun of her, Briar threatens other boys with knives, and Sandry is caught looking at the looms too much. They are all taken to Discipline Cottage, an isolated cottage for children who do not fit in, where they are overseen there by Dedicate Lark, a kind and gentle thread mage, and Dedicate Rosethorn, a sharp plant mage.

The four learn they have magic, which none of them knew about. While they all practice meditation, each of the four is matched with a main teacher to guide them through their magical learning. Sandry begins studying with Lark, learning to weave and spin; Tris studies with Niko about weather; Daja is taken under the wing of Dedicate Frostpine, the greatest smith mage; Briar works with Rosethorn in her garden and workshop. They each grow closer together and stronger in their magic.

During the course of the book, there have been tremors all summer. Near the end of the book, a big earthquake comes, having gained power by bouncing off the walls of a crystal used in an attempt to trap it. Just before, the four were out walking Little Bear, their dog, when he runs down a path and into the back of a large cave. The four and their dog are stuck underground when the earthquake begins. Daja holds the roof of their small space up by making a magical "suraku" around the space to help save them. Tris and Briar begin their own protections and Tris starts to open up air vents. However, the three of them cannot finish, because each person does not have the skill to finish. Sandry remembers her time trapped in the storage room and is paralyzed with fear when she remembers her weaving bag. She infuses it with the essences of the four and weaves their magic together, so each can complete his or her jobs.

The four and their dog are rescued by their teachers after the quake. It is discovered that they are under the kitchens of the temple.

At the very end of the book, Tris, Briar, and Daja present Sandry with a light-filled crystal to help her conquer her fear of the dark.

Characters
 Lady Sandrilene fa Toren – young noble girl with thread magic
 Trisana Chandler – young merchant girl with weather magic
 Briar Moss – young thief with plant magic
 Daja Kisubo – young Trader girl with smith magic
 Niko – powerful seer mage who finds the four and is Tris's main teacher. 
 Dedicate Lark – kind weaver mage at Discipline Cottage who is Sandry's main teacher
 Dedicate Rosethorn – sharp plant mage at Discipline who is Briar's main teacher
 Dedicate Frostpine – smith mage who teaches Daja
 Duke Vedris IV – the ruler of Emelan and Sandry's great-uncle
 Kirel – Frostpine's apprentice and Daja's friend
 Little Bear – dog that the four saved when it was being beaten up which they now keep
 Moonstream – dedicate superior of Winding Circle
 Dedicate Gorse – cooking mage at Winding Circle
 Dedicate Crane – plant mage who is Rosethorn's rival and has constructed a greenhouse

See also

Magic Steps
The Will of the Empress

External links
 *Sandry's Book* at Tamora Pierce's official site

1997 fantasy novels
1997 American novels
Emelanese books